Harry Bates (April 27, 1927 – November 1, 2022) was an American architect. He designed modernist houses on Fire Island and in the Hamptons. Bates was born in Lake City, Florida. He passed away in Fernandina Beach, Florida.

References

1927 births
2022 deaths
People from Lake City, Florida
Place of death missing
Architects from New York (state)